Daniel Alejandro "Dani" Torres Rojas (born 15 November 1989) is a Colombian professional footballer who plays as a defensive midfielder.

Club career

Santa Fe
Born in Cáqueza, Cundinamarca, Torres joined Independiente Santa Fe's youth setup in 2005 at the age of 15. He made his senior debut on 8 June 2008, starting in a 0–3 away loss against América de Cali.

On 8 July 2011, Torres was loaned to fellow league team Atlético Nacional until the end of the year, with a buyout clause. However, he only appeared sparingly for the club, being released in the end of the year mainly due to disciplinary problems (some of them related to alcoholism).

Upon returning to Santa Fe, Torres established himself as a regular starter and helped the side in their 2012 and 2014 successful campaigns. He scored his first professional goal on 9 August of the latter year, netting the second in a 2–1 home win against Independiente Medellín.

Independiente Medellín
On 5 July 2015, Torres and fellow Santa Fe teammate Luis Carlos Arias were transferred to Independiente Medellín. He featured regularly for the side during his spell, scoring two goals in the 2015 season.

Alavés
On 19 July 2016, Torres signed a four-year contract with Deportivo Alavés, newly promoted to La Liga. He made his debut in the category on 21 August, starting in a 1–1 away draw against Atlético Madrid.

Albacete (loan)
On 31 January 2019, after featuring rarely during the first half of the campaign, Torres was loaned to Segunda División side Albacete Balompié, for six months.

Zaragoza
On 31 January 2020, Torres joined Real Zaragoza in the second division until the end of the season, after terminating his contract with Alavés.

Albacete return
On 7 February 2021, free agent Torres returned to Albacete on a contract until the end of the campaign.

International career
On 6 November 2015, Torres was called up by Colombia national team manager José Pékerman for two 2018 FIFA World Cup qualifying matches against Chile and Argentina. He made his full international debut six days later, playing the full 90 minutes in a 1–1 draw against the former.

Torres was also included in Pékerman's final 23-man list for the Copa América Centenario, featuring regularly as his side finished third.

Personal life
In October 2016, Torres produced a video urging Colombians against supporting the peace deal with FARC. Torres is a devout Christian, who cited his opposition to then president Juan Manuel Santos as that Santos did not put Jesus at the center of his politics.

Career statistics

Club

Notes

Honours

Club
Santa Fe
Categoría Primera A: 2012-I, 2014-II
Copa Colombia: 2009
Superliga Colombiana: 2013, 2015

International
Colombia
Copa América: Third place 2016

References

External links

1989 births
Living people
People from Cundinamarca Department
Colombian footballers
Association football midfielders
Categoría Primera A players
Independiente Santa Fe footballers
Atlético Nacional footballers
Independiente Medellín footballers
La Liga players
Segunda División players
Primera Federación players
Deportivo Alavés players
Albacete Balompié players
Real Zaragoza players
CD Castellón footballers
Copa América Centenario players
Colombia international footballers
Colombian expatriate footballers
Colombian expatriate sportspeople in Spain
Expatriate footballers in Spain
Colombian Christians